Orobanche caryophyllacea is a plant species in the family Orobanchaceae.

Sources

References 

caryophyllacea